Justice Kellogg may refer to:

Daniel Kellogg (judge), associate justice of the Vermont Supreme Court
Henry T. Kellogg, associate justice of the New York Court of Appeals
John P. Kellogg, associate justice of the Connecticut Supreme Court
Loyal C. Kellogg, associate justice of the Vermont Supreme Court